Adrienne Posta (born Adrienne Luanne Poster, 24 March 1949) is an English actress and singer, prominent during the 1960s and 1970s. She adopted the surname 'Posta' in 1966.

Biography
Posta appeared in films such as To Sir with Love (1967) and Here We Go Round the Mulberry Bush, Up the Junction (both 1968), Spring and Port Wine (1970), and Carry On Behind (1975). She also featured in many TV programmes, including the first episode of Budgie (1971), where she appeared as a stripper. She appeared throughout the BBC 1 series It's Lulu (1973), singing, dancing and acting alongside her friend Lulu and comedian Roger Kitter.

Posta also recorded a number of singles. She has worked as a teacher in the Midlands and at the Italia Conti Academy of Theatre Arts. Posta is an honorary patron of the Music Hall Guild of Great Britain and America.

Filmography

Film
No Time for Tears (1957) – Cathy Harris
To Sir, With Love (1967) – Moira Joseph
Here We Go Round the Mulberry Bush (1968) – Linda
Up the Junction (1968) – Rube
Some Girls Do (1969) – Drummond's Daily
All the Way Up (1970) – Daphne Dunmore
Spring and Port Wine (1970) – Betty Duckworth
Percy (1971) – Maggie Hyde
Up Pompeii (1971) – Scrubba
The Alf Garnett Saga (1972) – Rita
Percy's Progress (1974) – PC 217
Three for All (1975) – Diane
Carry On Behind (1975) – Norma Baxter
Adventures of a Taxi Driver (1976) – Carol
Adventures of a Private Eye (1977) – Lisa Moroni

Television
 Hancock  (1963), 1 episode – Girl
The Human Jungle – episode: "Conscience on a Rack" (1964) – Hazel Phillips
The Master (1966)
Journey to the Unknown (1968), episode: "Miss Belle" 
Don't Ask Us - We're New Here (1969)
Dear Mother...Love Albert (1970) - Nurse Fleming - ('Hearts and Flowers' episode)
Alexander the Greatest (1971)
Budgie (1971), episode: "Out" – The Salford Stripper
It's Lulu (1973)
Till Death Us Do Part (1974), episode: "Party Night" – Millie
Moody and Pegg (1974–1975)
Edward the Seventh (1975) – Marie Lloyd
Bar Mitzvah Boy (1976)
Minder (1980) – Jenny
In Loving Memory (1980), episode: "The Angels Want Me for a Sunbeam" – Sister Joanna
The Olympian Way (1981) – Eva 
Red Dwarf (1997), episode "Ouroboros" 
The Wishing Chair (1998) – additional female characters
64 Zoo Lane (1999-2000) animated television series – voiced several characters, including Doris the Duck, Janet and Janice the Mother Kangaroos, Pauline the Pelican, Isabel the Flamingo, Melanie the Moose, Esmeralda the Snake, Annabelle the Flamingo, Sharon the Puffin, Edna the Hyena and Petula the Parrot (US version) 
Preston Pig (2000) – Preston's Mom
Angelina Ballerina (2001) – Grandma Mouseling

Theatre
Up in the Gallery, playing the lead role of Marie Lloyd alongside Jack Douglas and John Altman
Babes in the Wood, playing Maid Marion alongside Edward Woodward at the London Palladium.
Piaf, playing the role of Edith Piaf circa 1983
SuperTed: A Musical for Children, playing the role of The Blue Fairy alongside Derek Griffiths, David Tate, Sheila Steafel, Victor Spinetti, Melvyn Hayes, Peter Blake and Roy Kinnear.

Discography
Her first recordings were as Adrienne Poster.
 7" single "Only Fifteen" / "There's Nothing You Can Do About That" – Decca F 11797 (1963)
 7" single "Shang A Doo Lang" / "When A Girl Really Loves You" – Decca F 11864 (1964)
 7" single "He Doesn't Love Me" / "The Way You Do The Things You Do" – Decca F 12079 (1965)
 7" single "The Winds That Blow" / "Backstreet Girl" – Decca F 12181 (1965)
 7" single "Something Beautiful" / "So Glad You're Mine" – Decca F 12329 (1966)
Subsequent recordings were as Posta.
 7" single "They Long To Be Close To You" / "How Can I Hurt You?" – Decca F 12455 (1966)
 7" single "Dog Song" / "Express Yourself" – DJM DJS 286 (1973)
 7" single "Cruisin' Casanova" / "Sing Me" – President PT 453 (1976)
She also recorded as part of Jonathan King's group the Piglets:
 7" single "Johnny Reggae" / backing track – Bell Records (1971)

References

External links

1949 births
Living people
Actresses from London
English film actresses
English television actresses
English voice actresses
Singers from London
20th-century English actresses
20th-century English singers
20th-century English women singers